Tulio Halperin Donghi (October 27, 1926 – November 14, 2014) was an Argentine historian. After earning a Ph.D in history and a law degree at the University of Buenos Aires, he taught at the institution's Faculty of Arts from 1955 to 1966. Halperin Donghi then moved to the National University of the Litoral, where he was named dean. He later taught at Oxford University, and became a faculty member of the University of California, Berkeley in 1972.

Biography
Halperin Donghi was born in Buenos Aires in 1926. He received both a juris doctor and a Doctorate in History from the University of Buenos Aires in 1955. Halperín became a renowned Latin American historian.

Exiled in 1966, following the Noche de los Bastones Largos [Night of the Long Batons], he divided his time between the University of California and the University of Buenos Aires. Halperin was given an award for Scholarly Distinction from the American Historical Association in 1998, and authored numerous books.

Books
Un conflicto nacional: moriscos y cristianos viejos en Valencia, 1957 
Tradición política española e ideología revolucionaria de Mayo, 1961
Historia contemporánea de América Latina, 1967  (other editions
El Río de la Plata al comenzar el siglo XIX, 1961
Historia de la Universidad de Buenos Aires, 1962
Revolución y Guerra: Formación de una élite dirigente en la Argentina criolla, 1972 
The Aftermath of Revolution in Latin America (translation of Hispanoamérica después de la independencia), 1973
Politics, Economics and Society in Argentina in the Revolutionary Period (translation of Revolución y Guerra), 1975 
La democracia de masas, 1991
The Contemporary History of Latin America (translation of Historia de América Latina), 1993 
Proyecto y construcción de una Nación, 1996 
Son Memorias, 2008 
 La Argentina y la Tormenta Del Mundo: Ideas e Ideologías Entre 1930 y 1945

References

External links
Google Books listing

1926 births
2014 deaths
Writers from Buenos Aires
Latin Americanists
Historians of Latin America
Argentine male writers
20th-century Argentine historians
University of Buenos Aires alumni
Academic staff of the National University of the Littoral
Academic staff of the University of Buenos Aires
University of California, Berkeley College of Letters and Science faculty
Academics of the University of Oxford